24th Infantry Division is a formation of the Bangladesh Army. It is one of the three infantry division in Chittagong Division. It is headquartered in Chittagong Cantonment in the Chittagong District. It is the largest infantry division of Bangladesh Army.

History 
After the liberation war five brigades of Bangladesh army was formed. Among them 65th Infantry Brigade was headquartered in Chittagong.

Later (in 1977) the brigade was upgraded to the 24th Infantry Division. Major General Mizanur Rahman Shamim is the current GOC. The division is covers the Chittagong Hill Tracts. 24th Infantry division is the largest infantry division that compromises 33% of the personal of Army.

Components 
 24th Artillery Brigade (Guimara Cantonment)
 69th Infantry Brigade (Bandarban Cantonment)
 203rd Infantry Brigade (Khagrachari Cantonment)
 305th Infantry Brigade (Rangamati Cantonment)

Operation Dragon Drive 
Post-independence, Purba Banglar Sarbahara Party emerged as one of the main opponents of the new Awami League-government. In April 1973 the Purba Banglar Jatiya Mukti Front, a coalition of 11 groups, was formed. After the formation of the front, the party initiated a campaign of armed struggle against the Bangladeshi state. The party was active in the Dhaka, Barisal, Faridpur, Mymensingh, Tangail, Chittagong, Sylhet and Comilla districts. It carried out assassinations of Awami League cadres and attacks on police stations throughout the country.

At the request of request of Sheikh Mujibur Rahman then 65th Infantry Brigade commander Dastgir took over counter-insurgency operations in his command area and led Bangladesh's first successful combined army, navy, air force military operation called "Operation Dragon Drive" in the Chittagong Hill Tracts region against "Shorbohara" separatist insurgents in the Chittagong Hill Tracts.

Assassination of Ziaur Rahman 

On 29 May 1981 Zia went on tour to Chittagong to help resolve an intra-party political dispute in the regional BNP. Zia and his entourage stayed overnight at the Chittagong Circuit House in Chittagong Cantonment. In the early hours of the morning of 30 May, he was assassinated by a group of army officers led by GOC of 24th Infantry Division Major General Abul Manzoor. Also killed were six of his bodyguards and two aides.

Manzoor was killed shortly after while being captured. 18 officers were brought before a military tribunal, 13 were sentenced to death whilst 5 were given varying prison sentences a hasty trial in a military court.

Chittagong Hill Tracts conflict 

The Chittagong Hill Tracts Conflict was the political conflict and armed struggle between the Government of Bangladesh by the Parbatya Chattagram Jana Sanghati Samiti (United People's Party of the Chittagong Hill Tracts) and its armed wing, the Shanti Bahini over the issue of autonomy and the rights of the tribes of the Chittagong Hill Tracts.

The Shanti Bahini launched an insurgency against government forces in 1977. 24th Infantry Division of Bangladesh Army took part in this counter insurgency operation. The conflict continued for twenty years until the government and the PCJSS signed the Chittagong Hill Tracts Peace Accord in 1997. In February 1998 Shantu Larma formally disbanded the Shanti Bahini. Almost 1500 fighters surrendered their weapons. According to official figure more than 8,500 rebels, soldiers and civilians have been killed during two decades of insurgency. The number of civilians killed is estimated at 2,500.

References 

Infantry divisions of Bangladesh
Military units and formations established in the 1970s